Ishku-ye Bala (also Romanized as Īshku-ye Bālā; also known as Ayshakhku, Bālā Īshkūh, Īshekūh, Īshkuh-e Bālā, and Īshkūh) is a village in Deylaman Rural District, Deylaman District, Siahkal County, Gilan Province, Iran. At the 2006 census, its population was 69, in 21 families.

References 

Populated places in Siahkal County